Oberschöna is a municipality in the district of Mittelsachsen, in Saxony, Germany.

References 

Mittelsachsen